Editorial Planeta-DeAgostini is a Spanish-Italian  publisher and a subsidiary of Grupo Planeta and De Agostini specializing in collectable books, sold periodically in pieces  through newsstands (partworks). It has its headquarters in Barcelona.

They distribute comics and manga under the name Planeta DeAgostini Comics. It is a major shareholder in broadcaster Antena 3 de Televisión.

Planeta-DeAgostini operates in Argentina, Brazil, Chile, Colombia, Ecuador, Italy, Japan, Mexico, Portugal, Spain and Uruguay.

See also

Planeta Group
De Agostini

References

External links
Planeta DeAgostini 
Planeta DeAgostini Comics 

Publishing companies of Italy
Publishing companies of Spain
Manga distributors
Manhwa distributors
Mass media in Barcelona
Planeta Group